The Gobi Desert (French: Le Désert de Gobi) is a 1941 adventure novel by the French writer Pierre Benoit.

Plot
Set in 1928, the plot revolves around two Russian biologists who travel to the Gobi Desert in search of a rare animal, that they are planning to protect from a fascist politician who was overthrown, who plans on sending it to the biggest animal smuggling ring in European history.

References

Bibliography
 Pierre de Boisdeffre. Une histoire vivante de la littérature d'aujourd'hui, 1939-1960. Le Livre Contemporain, 1960.

1941 French novels
French adventure novels
Novels by Pierre Benoit 
Éditions Albin Michel books